Lat Pau was one of the earliest Chinese-language newspapers published in Singapore. It was first published in December 1881 by See Ewe Lay under Lat Pau Press Ltd. It was published for 52 years, ending in March 1932. It was it the longest-running local-run Chinese newspaper before World War II. 

Lat Pau initially was published in Classical Chinese. In 1925 the newspaper started publishing in Vernacular Chinese. The newspaper's first editor was Yeh Chi Yun.

References

External links
 Infopedia

 

Chinese-language newspapers
Defunct newspapers published in Singapore
Chinese-language mass media in Singapore
Publications established in 1881
Publications disestablished in 1932